Goldfrapp are an English electronic music duo that formed in London in 1999. The group gained prominence after their debut studio album Felt Mountain was shortlisted for the 2001 Mercury Prize in the United Kingdom. They have released five studio albums: Felt Mountain (2000), Black Cherry (2003), Supernature (2005), Seventh Tree (2008) and Head First (2010). The group's remix album, We Are Glitter was released in the United States in October 2006 and the compilation album The Singles was released internationally in February 2012.

Black Cherry was released through Mute Records in April 2003. Singles from the album included "Train", "Strict Machine" and "Twist". Black Cherry earned the group two awards, including an Ivor Novello Award (The Ivors Dance Award) for the song "Strict Machine". Supernature was released through the same label in August 2005. The album earned Goldfrapp two Grammy Award nominations in the dance category. Their fourth album, Seventh Tree, was released in February 2008. Singles included "A&E", "Happiness" and "Caravan Girl". The music video for "Happiness" earned Goldfrapp and director Dougal Wilson a nomination for Best Pop Video at the UK Music Video Awards. Head First was released in March 2010. The album earned the group two additional Grammy Award nominations.

Other recognitions include the inclusion of Supernature on Rolling Stone magazine's "Top 50 Albums of 2006" list. Goldfrapp have also been recognized by the ASCAP/PRS Awards, BT Digital Music Awards, International Dance Music Awards, MTV Europe Music Awards and the Q Awards. Overall, Goldfrapp have received two awards from 15 nominations.

AIM Independent Music Awards
AIM is a trade body established in 1999 to provide a collective voice for the UK's independent music industry.

|- 
| 2017
| "Anymore"
| Independent Track of the Year
|

ASCAP/PRS Awards
The ASCAP/PRS Awards are presented annually by the American Society of Composers, Authors and Publishers (ASCAP) to British writer and publisher members of the PRS for Music (PRS) for significant performances of their works in the United States. Goldfrapp have received one award from one nomination.

Best Art Vinyl
The Best Art Vinyl Awards are yearly awards established in 2005 by Art Vinyl Ltd to celebrate the best album artwork of the past year. 
{| class="wikitable"
|-
!Year
!width="250"|Nominated work
!width="325"|Award
!width="65"|Result
!Ref.
|-
| align="center"|2005
| Supernature
| rowspan=2|Best Vinyl Art
| 
| 
|-
| align="center"|2008
| Seventh Tree
| 
|

Brit Awards
The Brit Awards are the British Phonographic Industry's (BPI) annual pop music awards. Goldfrapp have been nominated twice.

BT Digital Music Awards
Created in 2001, the BT Digital Music Awards are awarded annually by the British telecommunications company BT. Goldfrapp have been nominated twice.

D&AD Awards
Design and Art Direction (D&AD) is a British educational charity which exists to promote excellence in design and advertising.

|-
| 2004
| "Strict Machine"
| Animation
| style="background:#BF8040"| Wood Pencil
|-
| 2009
| "Happiness"
| Music Video 
| style="background:#8a8b89"| Graphite Pencil

DanceStar USA Awards

!Ref.
|-
| 2004
| Black Cherry
| Best New Artist Album
| 
|

GLAAD Media Awards

The GLAAD Media Awards were created in 1990 by the Gay & Lesbian Alliance Against Defamation to "recognize and honor media for their fair, accurate and inclusive representations of the LGBT community and the issues that affect their lives."

|-
| 2014
| Tales of Us
| Outstanding Music Artist
|

Gay Music Chart Awards
{| class="wikitable"
|-
!Year
!width="250"|Nominated work
!width="325"|Award
!width="65"|Result
!Ref.
|-
| align="center"|2017
| "Systemagic"
| Best Queer Music Video
| 
|

Grammy Awards
The Grammy Awards are awarded annually by the National Academy of Recording Arts and Sciences of the United States for outstanding achievements in the record industry. Often considered the highest music honor, the awards were established in 1958. Goldfrapp have received four nominations.

Ibiza Music Video Festival

Ibiza Music Video Festival is a global and interactive music video festival.

|-
| 2017
| "Systemagic"
| Best Choreography 
|

International Dance Music Awards
The International Dance Music Awards, which take place during the annual Winter Music Conference, recognize achievements in the electronic dance music industry. Goldfrapp have received three nominations.

Ivor Novello Awards
The Ivor Novello Awards, named after the Cardiff-born entertainer Ivor Novello, are awards for songwriting and composing. Goldfrapp have received two awards from two nominations.

Mercury Prize
The Mercury Prize is an annual music prize awarded for the best album from the United Kingdom and Ireland. Goldfrapp have been nominated once.

Music Week Awards
Founded by British music magazine Music Week, the Music Week Awards are presented annually.

MTV Europe Music Awards
The MTV Europe Music Awards were established in 1994 by MTV Europe to celebrate the most popular music videos in Europe. Goldfrapp have been nominated once.

Muso Awards
The Muso Awards is a charity music award ceremony held in London, England, that began in September 2002.  The awards are voted "by musicians, for musicians", and the ceremony features live performances by a variety of artists. The 2005 event was held at Koko, in Camden Town, very few winners were present to receive their awards.

!Ref.
|-
| 2005
| Alison Goldfrapp
| Best Female Vocal
| 
|

PLUG Awards
The PLUG Awards are given in support of indie music.

|-
| 2007
| We Are Glitter
| Electronic/Dance Album of the Year
|

Q Awards
The Q Awards are the UK's annual pop music awards run by the music magazine Q magazine to honor musical excellence. Winners are voted by readers of Q.

|-
| 2001
| rowspan="2" | Themselves 
| Best New Act 
| 
|-
| 2003
| Q Innovation in Sound 
|  
|-
| 2005
| Supernature
| Best Album
|  
|-
| 2008
| "Happiness" 
| Best Video
|

Popjustice 20 Quid Music Prize

The Popjustice £20 Music Prize, also known as the Popjustice Twenty Quid Prize, is an annual prize awarded by music website Popjustice to recognise the best British pop single of the previous year. The prize was conceived by Popjustice founder Peter Robinson in 2003 as a reaction to what he perceived as the pompous and elitist nature of the existing Mercury Prize, which recognises the best album of the previous year, and in particular its exclusion of pop music acts in favour of those from more esoteric genres. The shortlist for the Popjustice prize is announced in September of each year and the winner named the following month, to coincide with the presentation of the Mercury Prize. Popjustice gives a token prize of £20 to the winner of its award, in contrast to the £20,000 given to the winner of the Mercury Prize.

|-
| 2005
| "Ooh La La"
| rowspan="3" | Best British Pop Single
| 
|-
| 2006
| "Number 1"
| 
|-
| 2008
| "A&E"
|

UK Music Video Awards
The UK Music Video Awards recognize "creativity and technical excellence" in music videos made within the United Kingdom. Goldfrapp have been nominated once.

Music Producers Guild Awards
The Music Producers Guild Awards are awarded annually by the Music Producers Guild, a UK Music not-for-profit company run by volunteers from the membership.

Other recognitions
2006 – Rolling Stone magazine ranked Supernature number 32 on their "Top 50 Albums of 2006" list
2009 – Seventh Tree was ranked at number 19 by Q in their list of "50 Best Albums of 2008"

References

External links

Official website

Awards
Goldfrapp